Hermathena candidata is a species of butterfly in genus Hermathena of the family Riodinidae. It is found from Costa Rica to Colombia, the Guianas and Bolivia east of Andes.

The larvae feed on Vriesea species.

Subspecies
Hermathena candidata candidata (Bolivia)
Hermathena candidata columba Stichel, 1910 (Colombia)

References
Hewitson, William Chapman (1876), Illustrations of New Species of Exotic Butterflies, Selected Chiefly from the Collections of W. Wilson Saunders and William C. Hewitson, Volume 5.

External links

Tree of Life web project: Hermathena candidata
ADW: Hermathena candidata: classification

Riodinidae
Butterflies described in 1874
Taxa named by William Chapman Hewitson
Riodinidae of South America